Mehdi bey Frashëri (28 February 1872 – 25 May 1963) was an Albanian intellectual and politician. He served as Prime Minister of Albania in the 1930s and as Chairman of the Provisional Administration Committee in the Albanian puppet government under Nazi Germany.

Biography

Early life
Mehdi Frashëri was born on 28 February 1872 in Frashër, Janina Vilayet, then Ottoman Empire. His father was Ragip bey kaymakam of Metsovo. Frashëri studied in Konica and Monastir and graduated from the Mekteb-i Mülkiye in Istanbul in 1897.

While in Istanbul, in 1901, he was charged with establishing a small press in a local house cellar for printing Albanian nationalistic materials together with a small group of Albanians.

Early political career and interwar period 

Frashëri served as Kaymakam of Peqin in central Albania between 1901 and 1903. After that he moved to Ohrid, where he joined the Secret Committee for the Liberation of Albania. He was denounced by a group of local Muslims as an Albanian nationalist and a pro-Young Turk. He was governor of the Mutasarrifate of Jerusalem under the Ottomans, mayor of Durrës under Prince Wied, minister in the Albanian government of 1918, and minister of the interior in 1920. On May 17, 1914, as a member of the International Commission of Control he signed the Protocol of Corfu. He participated in the Congress of Durrës in December 1918. In 1923, he was also Albania's representative in the League of Nations. During the 1930s he held significant posts, including that of the Prime Minister from 1935 to 1936. In the early 1930s he participated in the civil code reforms committees along with Thoma Orologa and Hasan Dosti.

Italian occupation

Frashëri was against Benito Mussolini and disliked his policy of invading Albania. Frasheri took it upon himself to broadcast scathing attacks against the invasion as well as addressing a remonstrance to Mussolini. Following the departure of the government of Tirana, he urged young men with revolvers to distribute themselves to preserve order. When the invading troops were at the gates he sought asylum in the Turkish Legation, continuing to refuse to sign a declaration in support of the Italians. His personal courage impressed even the German minister, who successfully appealed to Rome to allow Frashëri to return home. Despite Italian guarantees, Frashëri was soon arrested and interned in Italy.

Frashëri participated as "Honorary Chairman" of the Conference of Pezë, where Albanian anti-fascist factors gathered in 1942, a fact that would be suppressed by the communist regime later.

Frashëri, who had sympathy for the Germans partly because he had studied in Austria, worked with German minister , in the hopes of establishing closer relations and to gain some protection for the Albanians from the Italians.

German occupation
After the capitulation of Italy, Nazi Germany took control of the Balkans. The Germans were apprised of his significance and began to search for him immediately after the invasion. After the end of the meeting, it was agreed that Albania would have its own sovereignty under Nazi Germany, similar to the Independent State of Croatia.

Frashëri agreed to serve as regent as well as head the council. The leadership of the council was originally designed to rotate, but Lef Nosi declined for health reasons, and Anton Harapi argued that as a Catholic monk, he could accept no position in which he would be forced to sanction the death penalty.

After World War II
When the Partisans declared victory in Albania, the Germans evacuated, taking Mehdi Frashëri with them. Frashëri moved to Vienna and eventually settled in Rome, where he lived until his death.

References

Frasheri, Bej, Mehdi
Albanian Sufis
1872 births
1963 deaths
Albanian collaborators with Nazi Germany
Albanian nobility
Albanian anti-communists
19th-century Albanian politicians
20th-century Albanian politicians
People from Janina vilayet
Interior ministers of Albania
Foreign ministers of Albania
Bektashi Order
Mekteb-i Mülkiye alumni
Mehdi
Government of Durrës
People from Gjirokastër County